The Wasatch Stake Tabernacle  in Heber City, Wasatch County, Utah,  USA was completed in 1889, and served as a Latter Day Saints meetinghouse reserved for especially large congregations until 1965.  The tabernacle, which has a capacity  of 1,500 in its pews, was added to the National Register of Historic Places in a joint listing with the adjacent Heber Amusement Hall on December 2, 1970.

Construction began in 1887 and the dedication of the completed building occurred on May 5, 1889 where it was reported that the building costs of the tabernacle were $30,000.  Then President of the Wasatch Stake, Abram Hatch was superintendent of the building project and Alexander Fortie the architect. The tabernacle is built with red sandstone that was quarried from the Lake Creek area east of Heber. Originally, the tabernacle was heated by four potbelly stoves, one in each corner. Additions were made in 1928 and 1954.  In 1980 the tabernacle was sold to Heber City and now functions as a community hall.

Interior

References

External links

Ruth Witt Furr papers concerning the demolition of the Wasatch Stake Tabernacle, MSS 6095 at L. Tom Perry Special Collections, Brigham Young University

19th-century Latter Day Saint church buildings
Buildings and structures in Heber City, Utah
Former churches in Utah
Former Latter Day Saint religious buildings and structures
Churches on the National Register of Historic Places in Utah
Churches completed in 1889
Tabernacles (LDS Church) in Utah
Historic American Buildings Survey in Utah
National Register of Historic Places in Wasatch County, Utah
1889 establishments in Utah Territory